Paul Lehmann (13 July 1884 – 4 January 1964) was a German paleographer and philologist.

Biography 

Paul Lehmann was the son of businessman Gustav Lehmann and his wife Louisa Meyer. After attending school in his hometown, Lehmann started studying at the University of Göttingen.  A successor to Ludwig Traube, Paul Lehmann began as docent at the Ludwig Maximilian University of Munich in 1911 and became professor of medieval Latin philology there in 1917. Author of a dissertation on Franciscus Modius and a Habilitationsschrift on Johannes Sichardus, he made numerous contributions to the Sitzungsberichte der bayerischen Akademie. He is best known for Parodie im Mittelalter (1922). He also authored Pseudo-Antike Literatur des Mittelalters (1927) and published Mittelalterliche Bibliothekskataloge Deutschlands und der Schweiz. Lehmann assisted Max Manitius in the preparation of the third volume of the Geschichte der lateinischen Literatur des Mittelalters. 
He was named a Corresponding Fellow of the Medieval Academy of America in 1926, as well as fellow of numerous other European academies. A Festschrift entitled Liber Floridus, in honor of his sixty-fifth birthday, was published in 1950.

Publications 

 Franciscus Modius 1908
 Mittelalterliche Bibliothekskataloge Deutschlands und der Schweiz (1918 ff.)
 Die Parodie im Mittelalter (1922, 2nd edition 1963)
 Das literarische Bild Karls des Großen vornehmlich im lateinischen Schrifttum des Mittelalters (1934)
 Geschichte der Fuggerbibliotheken (1956/60, 2 volumes)
 Pseudoantike Literatur (1927)
 Gesta Ernesti ducis (1927)
 Judas Ischarioth (1930)
 Skandinavische Reisefrüchte (1935/39)

Notes

References 

 Bernhard Bischoff: [Obituary]. In: Jahrbuch der Bayerischen Akademie der Wissenschaften (1964), pp. 179–183.
 : Paul Lehmann. In: Forschungen und Fortschritte Jg. 39 (1965), pp. 94–95. 
 

German palaeographers
Scientists from Braunschweig
German philologists
University of Göttingen alumni
Academic staff of the Ludwig Maximilian University of Munich
1884 births
1964 deaths
Corresponding Fellows of the Medieval Academy of America
Members of the German Academy of Sciences at Berlin
Ahnenerbe members
Corresponding Fellows of the British Academy
20th-century philologists